Township  5 is a township in Harper County, Kansas, USA.  As of the 2000 census, its population was 463.

The township was officially designated "Township Number 5" until late 2007, when "Number" was dropped.

Geography

References

External links
 USGS Geographic Names Information System (GNIS)
 US-Counties.com
 City-Data.com

Townships in Harper County, Kansas
Townships in Kansas